Manitoulin was an electoral riding in Ontario, Canada. It was created in 1902 from part of the former electoral district of Algoma East, and was merged with Algoma to form Algoma-Manitoulin for the 1934 election.

MPPs elected

References

Former provincial electoral districts of Ontario